The Black and Tan Terrier was a broad breed or type of terrier that was one of the earliest terrier breeds. Although it is now extinct, it is believed to be the ancestor of all modern Fell Terrier breeds and the Welsh Terrier, a breed recognised by The Kennel Club.

History
Working Fell Terriers (non-Kennel Club working terriers from the rocky Lakeland Fells  region of the UK) have always been quite variable, but have always been coloured terriers (tan, black or black and tan), as opposed to the white-coated "foxing terriers" preferred in the south of England.

From the coloured rough-coated Fell Terriers of Cumberland, Westmorland and the Scottish Borders were developed several Kennel Club breeds, including the Lakeland Terrier, the Welsh Terrier, and the Border Terrier.

See also 
 List of dog breeds
 List of extinct dog breeds
 Tiny the Wonder, famous 19th century black and tan terrier.

References

 
 
 
 
 
 

Terriers
Dog breeds originating in the United Kingdom
Dog breeds originating in Wales
Extinct dog breeds